Dr. Muhammad Machasin is a professor of history of Islamic culture at the State Islamic University (UIN) Sunan Kalijaga in Yogyakarta, Indonesia. as well as a director of the Islamic Higher Education in Indonesia.  He has been actively promoting interfaith dialogue and is a member of the board of the Asian Council on Religion and Peace.

References

Further reading
 Sterkens, Carl. & Machasin, Muhammad. & Wijsen, Frans Jozef Servaas,(editors)  2009  Religion, civil society and conflict in Indonesia / edited by Carl Sterkens, Muhammad Machasin and Frans Wijsen   Piscataway, NJ  (Switzerland)  Nijmegen studies in development and cultural change  v. 45.

21st-century Indonesian historians
Islam in Indonesia
Living people
Year of birth missing (living people)